Amina Oyiza Bello, née Yakubu (born 2 April 1978) is a lawyer, philanthropist, and the first wife of Yahaya Bello, Kogi state governor. She is the CEO of Fairplus International, founder of Hayat Foundation, businesswoman, and a humanitarian.

She is the second of eight siblings.

Amina attended Obafemi Awolowo University in Nigeria, where she studied Law and received her LLB degree.

References 

Living people
1978 births
Obafemi Awolowo University alumni
Alumni of the University of Leicester
Nigerian philanthropists
Nigerian women lawyers
People from Kogi State
21st-century Nigerian lawyers